The siege of Damascus took place between 24 and 28 July 1148, during the Second Crusade. It ended in a crusader defeat and led to the disintegration of the crusade. The two main Christian forces that marched to the Holy Land in response to Pope Eugene III and Bernard of Clairvaux's call for the Second Crusade were led by Louis VII of France and Conrad III of Germany. Both faced disastrous marches across Anatolia in the months that followed, with most of their armies being destroyed. The original focus of the crusade was Edessa (Urfa), but in Jerusalem, the preferred target of King Baldwin III and the Knights Templar was Damascus. At the Council of Acre, magnates from France, Germany, and the Kingdom of Jerusalem decided to divert the crusade to Damascus.

The crusaders decided to attack Damascus from the west, where orchards of Ghouta would provide them with a constant food supply. Having arrived outside the walls of the city, they immediately put it to siege, using wood from the orchards. On 27 July, the crusaders decided to move to the plain on the eastern side of the city, which was less heavily fortified but had much less food and water. Afterwards, the local crusader lords refused to carry on with the siege, and the three kings had no choice but to abandon the city. The entire crusader army retreated back to Jerusalem by 28 July.

Background
The first hostile act between the Crusaders and the Burid rulers of Damascus was in form of raids in 1125, followed by the Battle of Marj al-Saffar in 1126, when the Crusaders defeated the Muslim army in the field but failed in their objective to capture Damascus. In 1129, they attacked Damascus again, when they camped near the Wooden Bridge (Jisr al-Khashab) at Dārayyā southwest of the city, but their siege of the city was unsuccessful, after their foraging expedition south into the Hauran was defeated, in addition to inability to advance due to a sudden thunderstorm and the ensuing fog, meanwhile, according to Michael the Syrian, who may be relying on the lost contemporary chronicle of Basil bar Shumna, Damascus paid 20,000 dinars and offered annual tribute in return for the crusaders' withdrawal. However, the crusaders managed to take Banias instead.

In 1140, Mu'in ad-Din Unur visited King Fulk in Jerusalem, following his assistance during Imad ad-Din Zengi's aggression against Damascus, he also handed Banias to the Crusader realm once more. 

In 1147, Baldwin III marched with his army to capture Bosra, south of Damascus, after an invitation from Altuntash, the emir of Bosra and Salkhad who squabbled with his nominal superior, Mu'in ad-Din Unur, ruler of Damascus. When they arrived at Bosra, the Crusaders' high hopes were dashed to capture it when they found that Altuntash's wife, made of sterner stuff than her husband, had introduced a Damascene garrison into Bosra's citadel. Unwilling to chance a siege close to an enemy host, Baldwin elected to withdraw.

Second Crusade

The two main Christian forces that marched to the Holy Land in response to Pope Eugene III and Bernard of Clairvaux's call for the Second Crusade were led by Louis VII of France and Conrad III of Germany. Conrad's force included Bolesław IV the Curly and Vladislaus II of Bohemia, as well as Frederick of Swabia, his nephew who would become Emperor Frederick I. The crusade had been called after the fall of the County of Edessa on 24 December 1144. The crusaders marched across Europe and arrived at Constantinople in September and October 1147.

Both faced disastrous marches across Anatolia in the months that followed, and most of their armies were destroyed. Louis abandoned his troops and travelled by ship to the Principality of Antioch, where his wife Eleanor of Aquitaine's uncle, Raymond, was prince. Raymond expected him to offer military assistance against the Seljuk Turks threatening the principality, but Louis refused and went to Jerusalem to fulfill his crusader vow. Conrad, stricken by illness, had earlier returned to Constantinople, but arrived in Jerusalem a few weeks later in early April 1148. The original focus of the crusade was Edessa, but in Jerusalem, the preferred target of King Baldwin III and the Knights Templar was Damascus.

Stephen, King of England did not participate in the second crusade due to internal conflicts. Meanwhile, King David I of Scotland was dissuaded by his subjects from joining the crusade himself.

Council of Acre
The Council of Acre was called with the Haute Cour of Jerusalem at Acre on 24 June. This was the most spectacular meeting of the Cour in its existence: Conrad, Otto of Freising, Henry II, Duke of Austria, Welf VI, future emperor Frederick, and William V, Marquess of Montferrat represented the Holy Roman Empire. Louis, Thierry of Alsace, and various other ecclesiastical and secular lords represented the French. From Jerusalem King Baldwin, Queen Melisende, Patriarch Fulk, Robert de Craon (master of the Knights Templar), Raymond du Puy de Provence (master of the Knights Hospitaller), Manasses of Hierges (constable of Jerusalem), Humphrey II of Toron, Philip of Milly, Walter I Grenier, and Barisan of Ibelin were among those present. Notably, no one from Antioch, Tripoli, or the former County of Edessa attended. Both Louis and Conrad were persuaded to attack Damascus.

Some of the barons native to Jerusalem pointed out that it would be unwise to attack Damascus, as the Burid dynasty, though Muslim, were their allies against the Zengid dynasty. Imad ad-Din Zengi had besieged the city in 1140, and Mu'in ad-Din Unur, a Mamluk acting as vizier for the young Mujir ad-Din Abaq, negotiated an alliance with Jerusalem through the chronicler Usama ibn Munqidh. Conrad, Louis, and Baldwin insisted, Damascus was a holy city for Christianity. Like Jerusalem and Antioch, it would be a noteworthy prize in the eyes of European Christians. In July their armies assembled at Tiberias and marched to Damascus, around the Sea of Galilee by way of Banias. There were perhaps 50,000 troops in total.

The general view now appears to be that the decision to attack Damascus was somewhat inevitable. Historians, such as Martin Hoch, regard the decision as the logical outcome of Damascene foreign policy shifting into alignment with the Zengid dynasty. King Baldwin III had previously launched a campaign with the sole objective of capturing the city. This damaged the Burid dynasty's relations with the Kingdom of Jerusalem.

Fiasco at Damascus

The crusaders decided to attack Damascus from the west, where orchards of Ghouta would provide them with a constant food supply. They arrived at Darayya on 23 July, with the army of Jerusalem in the vanguard, followed by Louis and then Conrad in the rearguard. The densely cultivated gardens and orchards would prove to be a serious obstacle for the crusaders. According to William of Tyre, the crusader army was prepared for battle:

24 July 

On Saturday 24 July, the crusaders began with an attack in the morning along the banks of the Barada river, as far as al-Rabweh. The Muslims were well prepared and constantly attacked the army advancing through the orchards outside Damascus. These orchards were defended by towers and walls and the crusaders were constantly pelted with arrows and lances along the narrow paths. There was a ferocious combat (pl) in the orchards and narrow roads at Mezzeh, between the Christian force and a mixture of professional troops of Damascus, the ahdath militia and Turkoman mercenaries. William of Tyre reported:

The historian David Nicolle wrote that William of Tyre did not explain how Conrad was able to bring his forces up from the rear to the front without totally disorganizing the Christian army. Thanks to a charge by Conrad, the crusaders managed to fight their way through and chase the defenders back across the Barada river and into Damascus, in which fortifications were installed to cut off any possible supplies to Damascus from the Beqaa Valley.

In the meantime, according to Syrian chronicler Abu Shama:

Having arrived outside the walls of the city, the crusaders immediately put it to siege, using wood from the orchards. They attacked the suburbs of Faradis at first, they also began to build their siege position opposite Bab al-Jabiya, where the Barada did not run past Damascus. Inside the city the inhabitants barricaded the major streets, preparing for what they believed to be an inevitable assault. Unur had sought help from Saif ad-Din Ghazi I of Mosul and Nur ad-Din Zangi of Aleppo, and led an attack on the crusader camp; the crusaders were pushed back from the walls into the orchards, where they were prone to ambushes and guerrilla attacks.

25 July 
During the counter-attack on Sunday, 25 July, the Damascus forces took heavy losses which included the 71-year-old lawyer and well known scholar named Yusuf al-Findalawi, the Sufi mystic Al-Halhli and soldier Nur al-Dawlah Shahinshah. By the end of 25 July, the crusaders set up a camp on the Green Field (Maydan al-Akhdar in modern-day Baramkeh), which was a grassy area used by the Damascene cavalry as a training ground.

26 July 
The defenders launched an attack to the north of Damascus to repel the attackers, despite heavy fighting, they managed to clear the area and receive reinforcements from Lebanon and Sayf ad-Din on 26 July onward, including archers from the Beqaa Valley which increased the number of defenders and doubled their supply of arms, according to Ibn al-Qalanisi. During a raid on the crusader camp on 26 July, according to Abu Shama:

27 July 
The crusaders probably intended to concentrate on the eastern and southern edge of the city, by attacking the weakest of the gates, Bab al-Saghir (Small Gate), built only of mud bricks. According to William of Tyre, on 27 July, the crusaders decided to move to the plain on the eastern side of the city, opposite Bab Tuma and Bab Sharqi, which was less heavily fortified but had much less food and water.

There were conflicts in both camps: Unur could not trust Saif ad-Din or Nur ad-Din not to conquer the city if their offer of help was accepted; and the crusaders could not agree about who would receive the city if they captured it. Guy I Brisebarre, lord of Beirut, was the suggestion of the local barons of the Kingdom of Jerusalem, but Thierry of Alsace, Count of Flanders, wanted it for himself and was supported by Baldwin, Louis, and Conrad. According to William of Tyre, the resulting dispute contributed to the final failure of the siege: 'for the local barons preferred that the Damascenes should keep their city rather than to see it given to the count', and so did all they could to ensure the siege collapsed. It was recorded by some that Unur had bribed the leaders to move to a less defensible position, and that Unur had promised to break off his alliance with Nur ad-Din if the crusaders went home.

28 July 
Nur ad-Din and Saif ad-Din had by now arrived at Homs and were negotiating with Unur for possession of Damascus, something that neither Unur nor the crusaders wanted. Saif ad-Din apparently also wrote to the crusaders, urging them to return home. With Nur ad-Din in the field it was impossible to return to their better position. The local Crusader lords refused to carry on with the siege, and the three kings had no choice but to abandon the city. First Conrad, then the rest of the army, decided to retreat back to Jerusalem on 28 July, though throughout their retreat they were followed by Muslim archers who constantly harassed them. Historians such as Ralph of Coggeshall, John of Salisbury and the annalist of Würzburg reported that the siege was abandoned when the Templars accepted a bribe, while William of Tyre and Michael the Syrian mentioned that the given coins were made of copper instead of gold.

English historian Henry of Huntingdon summed up the whole expedition, by writing:

Aftermath

Each of the Christian forces felt betrayed by the other. A new plan was made to attack Ascalon but this was abandoned due to the lack of trust that had resulted from the failed siege. This mutual distrust would linger for a generation due to the defeat, to the ruin of the Christian kingdoms in the Holy Land. Following the battle, Conrad returned to Constantinople to further his alliance with Manuel I Komnenos. As a result of the attack, Damascus no longer trusted the crusaders, and the city was formally handed over to Nur ad-Din in 1154. Bernard of Clairvaux was also humiliated, and when his attempt to call a new crusade failed, he tried to disassociate himself from the fiasco of the Second Crusade altogether.

Legacy
The French Crusader Robert de Brie, who took part in the Siege of Damascus in 1148, is sometimes credited for bringing the Damask rose from Syria to Europe. The Crusaders carved the fleur-de-lis on a stone outside Bab Sharqi, in addition to scattering coins in a ditch there.

During the Mandate for Syria and the Lebanon, the French built Mezzeh prison in 1920s, on a hill-top structure dates back to crusader days, and used it to house anti-colonial fighters and political prisoners.

Notes

References

Bibliography

Further reading
 The Damascus Chronicle of the Crusaders, extracted and translated from the Chronicle of Ibn al-Qalanisi. Edited and translated by H. A. R. Gibb. London, 1932.

External links

 Kenneth Setton, ed. – A History of the Crusades, vol. I. University of Pennsylvania Press, 1958. Retrieved on 27 March 2008
 William of Tyre – The Fiasco at Damascus (1148) at the Internet Medieval Sourcebook. Retrieved on 27 March 2008

Damascus 1148
Damascus 1148
Medieval Damascus
Conflicts in 1148
Burid Emirate
Damascus 1148
1148 in Asia
Damascus 1148
Damascus 1148
Damascus 1148
Damascus 1148
Sieges of Damascus
1140s in the Kingdom of Jerusalem
Battles involving the Zengid dynasty